Redcliffs is an outer coastal suburb of Christchurch, Canterbury, New Zealand.

History 
The area of Redcliffs was first populated by humans about 700 years ago. In the 14th century, large groups of Māori, initially the Waitaha people and then the Ngāti Māmoe tribe, settled in the area. The Ngāi Tahu eventually displaced Ngāti Māmoe and were still living in the area when the first Europeans arrived.

During 19th excavations of Moa Bone Point Cave in Redcliffs numerous artefacts were found. These included moa bones and egg shells, bones of seals, birds and fish, shellfish and many Māori taonga. This suggests that Moa Bone Point Cave was used as shelter by the first Māori people but also used as a place to store valuable items.

Location  
The suburb is most directly accessed from the city centre by a causeway that crosses the Avon Heathcote Estuary and is the suburb immediately before Sumner. Alternatively, Redcliffs can be accessed through McCormack's Bay Road, which circles the perimeter of the Avon Heathcote Estuary. The coastal road from Redcliffs to Sumner allows for further access to the port and suburb of Lyttelton and the Port Hills, and an alternative—if long—route to the city centre.

Geology
Redcliffs is characterised by rocky, hilly geography and has many natural caves in its sides. The domineering cliffs of Redcliffs are a snapshot of the region's volcanic origins. The cliffs are tinged with veins of red tephra, and composed of 'A'ā lava flows; the suburb draws its name from this the most notable of its physical features.

Demographics

Redcliffs had a population of 1,971 at the 2018 New Zealand census, an increase of 195 people (11.0%) since the 2013 census, and a decrease of 108 people (-5.2%) since the 2006 census. There were 822 households. There were 933 males and 1,035 females, giving a sex ratio of 0.9 males per female. The median age was 49.3 years (compared with 37.4 years nationally), with 276 people (14.0%) aged under 15 years, 285 (14.5%) aged 15 to 29, 957 (48.6%) aged 30 to 64, and 453 (23.0%) aged 65 or older.

Ethnicities were 93.2% European/Pākehā, 7.3% Māori, 0.8% Pacific peoples, 4.3% Asian, and 2.7% other ethnicities (totals add to more than 100% since people could identify with multiple ethnicities).

The proportion of people born overseas was 24.4%, compared with 27.1% nationally.

Although some people objected to giving their religion, 54.3% had no religion, 35.5% were Christian, 0.8% were Hindu, 1.1% were Muslim, 0.8% were Buddhist and 1.8% had other religions.

Of those at least 15 years old, 615 (36.3%) people had a bachelor or higher degree, and 144 (8.5%) people had no formal qualifications. The median income was $43,200, compared with $31,800 nationally. The employment status of those at least 15 was that 783 (46.2%) people were employed full-time, 291 (17.2%) were part-time, and 39 (2.3%) were unemployed.

The suburb is affluent by New Zealand standards and property values are relatively high, with the average house costing NZ$450,000 in 2006. Redcliffs has a significant number of baby boomers.

Recreation
Barnett Park, open to public access, and a product of the earliest council recreation planning in the wider Christchurch region, is located in Redcliffs. The suburb also hosts a bowling green, and a smaller park adjacent to the estuary which bears the suburb's name, Redcliffs Park.

2011 Christchurch earthquake

In contrast to the September 2010 earthquake, Redcliffs and the surrounding hills suffered significant damage in the 22 February 2011 earthquake. Dozens of houses were deemed unliveable and hundreds more damaged. There was a large scale evacuation of several streets in Redcliffs at 10pm on Thursday, 24 February after some cliffs surrounding Redcliffs were deemed unstable. The following morning, a few streets or partial streets remained cordoned off but many people were able to return to their homes immediately.

By 7 March, detailed geotechnical inspections of the affected land inside the remaining cordons began with a view to removing them. They were removed on 8 March.

Redcliffs citizens launched a local information centre on 26 February, followed by a regular newsletter from 27 February, followed by two support websites.

On 2 March, Redcliffs resident Peter Hyde launched a viral call to encourage more support, especially key supplies and information, for the worst affected Eastern suburbs of Christchurch. In particular those to the north of Redcliffs such as Parklands, Aranui, Bromley, Avonside, Bexley and New Brighton.

Redcliffs School 
Te Raekura Redcliffs School is a full primary school catering for years 1 to 8.

The school opened in 1907. It was temporarily relocated to Van Asch Deaf Education Centre,  from the original Main Road site, after the June 2011 aftershock. This decision came after concerns of the safety of pupils as the cliffs behind the school became unstable. In 2015 and 2016, Redcliffs School faced the risk of closure due to the risk of further disruption. After community backlash, it was decided to build a new site in Redcliffs Park, across the road from the original site. The new site was opened in June 2020.

References

Suburbs of Christchurch